The Cowley County National Bank Building, located at 820-822 Main St. in Winfield, Kansas, was built in 1886.  It was listed on the National Register of Historic Places in 1983.

It is a two-and-a-half-story limestone building.  It was designed by the Richie Brothers.

It was completed in 1886 and first occupied as the Farmers' Bank. From 1891 until 1922, it was operated at the Cowley County National Bank. The building was designed in the style of Second Empire architecture by local architects by W.A. Ritchie and W.J. Ritchie.

References

National Register of Historic Places in Cowley County, Kansas
Second Empire architecture in Kansas
Commercial buildings completed in 1886
Cowley County, Kansas
Bank buildings on the National Register of Historic Places in Kansas